State Route 165 (SR 165) is a  state highway that runs south-to-north, with a west-to-east middle section, through portions of Telfair, Dodge, and Laurens counties in the central part of the U.S. state of Georgia.

Route description
SR 165 begins as Mount Zion Street at an intersection with SR 132 southeast of Rhine, in Telfair County. It heads to the northeast to the town of Milan, where it intersects U.S. Route 280 (US 280)/SR 30. The three highways head to the west-southwest concurrently and enter Dodge County. In Rhine, they meet SR 117, where SR 165 departs to the north, concurrent with SR 117. Shortly afterward, SR 165 departs to the northeast along the Chauncey-Rhine Highway and eventually enters Chauncey. There, they meet US 23/US 341/SR 27. The four have a brief wrong-way concurrency in the town, until the blinker-light intersection with Milan-Chauncey Road and Chauncey-Dublin Highway, the latter of which is where SR 165 departs to the northeast. It continues to the northeast and very briefly enters Laurens County. Then, it re-enters Dodge County and meets its northern terminus, an intersection with SR 46 northeast of Eastman.

SR 165 is not part of the National Highway System.

Major intersections

See also

References

External links

 
 Georgia Roads (Routes 161 - 180)

165
Transportation in Telfair County, Georgia
Transportation in Dodge County, Georgia
Transportation in Laurens County, Georgia